For the athletics competitions at the 2004 Summer Olympics, the following qualification systems were in place.

Qualifying standards
A National Olympic Committee (NOC) may enter up to 3 qualified athletes in each individual event if all athletes meet the A standard during the qualifying period. An NOC may also enter a maximum of 1 qualified if they have met the B standard.  An NOC may also enter a maximum of 1 qualified relay team per event. NOCs may enter athletes regardless of mark (1 athlete per gender) if they have no athletes meeting the entry standard. This makes it possible for every nation to have a minimum of one representative of each gender in the sport.

The qualifying time standards may be obtained in various meets during the given period that have the approval of the IAAF. All approved outdoor meets and indoor meets with the exception of 100 m, 200 m and 110 /100 m hurdles races are eligible.

For the relays, the top 16 teams in each division were accepted.

The NOCs are still allowed to select athletes using their own rules, on the condition that all of them have made the qualifying time. For example, the United States selects athletes based on the results of the 2004 United States Olympic Trials event. Sweden only enters athletes deemed good enough to reach at least the eighth position, based on an assessment by the Swedish NOC.

The IAAF Qualifying Standards were as follows:

References

Qualification for the 2004 Summer Olympics
Olympics qualification
Qualification